The 2015 NCAA Division I Women's Golf Championship was the 34th annual tournament to determine the national champions of NCAA Division I women's collegiate golf. It was contested May 22–27, 2015, at The Concession Golf Club in Bradenton, Florida. The tournament was hosted by the University of South Florida. Two championships were awarded: team and individual.

This was the first time that the men's and women's Division I golf tournaments were played at the same location; the 2015 NCAA Division I Men's Golf Championship will be held in Bradenton from May 29 to June 3.

Regional qualifying tournaments
Four regional qualifying tournaments were held across the United States from May 7–9, 2015.
The six teams with the lowest team scores qualified from each of the four regional tournaments for both the team and individual national championships.
The three individuals not affiliated with one of the other teams in their regional with the lowest score also qualified for the individual national championship.

^ Teams listed in qualifying order.

Venue
This is the first NCAA Division I Women's Golf Championship held at The Concession Golf Club in Bradenton, Florida. This is the first time the tournament has been hosted by the University of South Florida.

Format
For the first time in NCAA women's golf history the National Championship would follow the format used for the men's National Championship adopted in 2009. All teams played 54 holes with the team score consisting of the four best scores of the five-player team for each individual round. The top 15 teams and the top 9 individuals after 54 holes advanced to the fourth round. The top eight teams after 72 holes advanced to the match play competition. The individual award was given at the end of the stroke play part of the competition, recognizing the individual who had the best combined score over the four rounds.

In match play, all five players play just as before and each match is worth one point with matches that end all-square are either postponed then continued, continued immediately or called a halve depending on the scores for both teams. For example, if Team A ties with Team B 2.5–2.5, the match that was all-square after 18 holes resumes in a sudden-death playoff.

Team competition

Leaderboard

Remaining teams: UNLV (931), South Carolina (932), Texas A&M (933), Tulane (935), LSU (938), Virginia (938), NC State (942), Campbell (950), California (953).

After 54 holes, the field of 24 teams was cut to the top 15.

Match play bracket
The eight teams with the lowest total scores advanced to the match play bracket.

Source:

Individual competition

The field was cut after 54 holes to the top 15 teams and the top nine individuals not on a top 15 team. These 84 players competed for the individual championship.

See also
2015 NCAA Division I Men's Golf Championship

References

NCAA Women's Golf Championship
Golf in Florida
NCAA Division I Women's Golf Championship
NCAA Division I Women's Golf Championship
NCAA Division I Women's Golf Championship
NCAA Division I Women's Golf Championship